This is a list of Maldivian films released in 2012.

Releases

Theatre releases

Short films

Television
This is a list of Maldivian series, in which the first episode was aired or streamed in 2012.

References

External links

Maldivian
2012